Symphlebia is a genus of moths in the family Erebidae. The genus was erected by Felder in 1874.

Species

Symphlebia abdominalis (Herrich-Schäffer, [1855])
Symphlebia affinis (Rothschild, 1909)
Symphlebia alinda (Dyar, 1909)
Symphlebia angulifascia (Rothschild, 1933)
Symphlebia aryllis Schaus, 1896
Symphlebia catenata (Schaus, 1905)
Symphlebia citraria (Dognin, 1889)
Symphlebia coarctata Toulgoët, 1991
Symphlebia costaricensis (Rothschild, 1909)
Symphlebia dissimulata (Reich, 1936)
Symphlebia distincta (Rothschild, 1933)
Symphlebia doncasteri (Rothschild, 1910)
Symphlebia dorisca (Schaus, 1933)
Symphlebia erratum (Schaus, 1933)
Symphlebia favillacea (Rothschild, 1909)
Symphlebia foliosa (Seitz, 1921)
Symphlebia fulminans (Rothschild, 1910)
Symphlebia geertsi (Hulstaert, 1924)
Symphlebia haenkei (Daniel, 1952)
Symphlebia haxairei Toulgoët, 1988
Symphlebia herbosa (Schaus, 1910)
Symphlebia hyalina (Rothschild, 1909)
Symphlebia ignipicta (Hampson, 1903)
Symphlebia indistincta (Rothschild, 1909)
Symphlebia ipsea (Druce, 1884)
Symphlebia jalapa (Druce, 1894)
Symphlebia jamaicensis (Schaus, 1896)
Symphlebia lophocampoides Felder, 1874
Symphlebia maculicincta (Hampson, 1901)
Symphlebia meridionalis (Schaus, 1905)
Symphlebia muscosa (Schaus, 1910)
Symphlebia neja (Schaus, 1905)
Symphlebia nigranalis (Schaus, 1915)
Symphlebia nigropunctata (Reich, 1935)
Symphlebia obliquefasciatus (Reich, 1935)
Symphlebia palmeri (Rothschild, 1910)
Symphlebia panema (Dognin, 1923)
Symphlebia primulina (Dognin, 1914)
Symphlebia pyrgion (Druce, 1897)
Symphlebia rosa (Druce, 1909)
Symphlebia similis (Rothschild, 1917)
Symphlebia suanoides (Schaus, 1921)
Symphlebia suanus (Druce, 1902)
Symphlebia sulphurea (Joicey & Talbot, 1916)
Symphlebia tessellata (Schaus, 1910)
Symphlebia tetrodonta (Dognin, 1911)
Symphlebia tolimensis (Rothschild, 1916)
Symphlebia underwoodi (Rothschild, 1910)
Symphlebia venusta (Dognin, 1921)

Former species
Symphlebia perflua (Walker, 1869)

References

 
Phaegopterina
Moth genera